The Kelly Gang; or the Career of the Outlaw, Ned Kelly, the Iron-clad Bushranger of Australia is an 1899 Australian play about bushranger Ned Kelly. It is attributed to Arnold Denham but it is likely a number of other writers worked on it.

Contemporary reviews remarked on the similarities the play had with Robbery Under Arms.

Denham sued for copyright infringement against the producers of other plays about Ned Kelly including Outlaw Kelly in 1899 and The Kelly Gang in 1901 (the latter was appealed unsuccessfully).

History
A production was staged on 18 May 1907 at His Majesty's Theatre in Perth. The cast featured Walter Dalgleish as Ned Kelly, Herbert Linden as Dan Kelly, Max Clifton as Steve Hart, Crosbie Ward as Joe Byrne, Stirling Whyte as Sergeant Steele, J. J. Ennis as Constable Fitzpatrick, Char Mortyne as Sergeant Kennedy, Albert Lucas as Aaron Sherritt, Charles Daniels as Mr. Scott, William Everett as Roberts, Leo D'Chateau as Murphy, Frank Reis as McGuire, Reg Harcourt as Mr. Curnow, Victor Scott as Mick Mulcahy, Frank Rosemore as McIntyre, D. Durant as Scanlon, Cecil Yates as Donnelly, Herbert Leonard as Macready Ham, Arthur Hart as Leon, Olive Trouchet as Melpomone Prim, Esther Birks as Flossy Blush, James Bell as Dan Healey, Ashton Williams as Father Gibney, Arthur Grant as Jones, Ina Alston as Mrs. Kelly, Roland Watts-Phillips as Lucretia Aspen, Maisie Maxwell as Mary Byrne, and Ada Lawrence as Kate Kelly.

Characters

Ned Kelly: An outlaw, referred to as "the Terror of the North East".
Dan Kelly: An outlaw, and the brother of Ned Kelly.
Steve Hart: An outlaw associate of Ned, and a neighbour of the Kelly family.
Joe Byrne: An outlaw associate of Ned, and a neighbour of the Kelly family.
Sergeant Steele: A police trooper, and Ned's main enemy. He is based on Sergeant Arthur Steele.
Sergeant Kennedy: A "brave and fearless" policeman. He is based on Sergeant Michael Kennedy.
Constable Fitzpatrick: He is based on Constable Alexander Fitzpatrick.
Aaron Sherritt: A police informer and former friend of Joe.
Mr. Scott: The manager of the National Bank, located in Euroa. He is based on Robert Scott.
Roberts: A clerk at the National Bank.
McGuinness: A junior police constable. In an earlier version of the show, he was named Moloney.
O'Hara: A junior police constable. In an earlier version of the show, he was named Murphy.
Lonergan: A trooper. He is based on Constable Thomas Lonergan.
Scanlon: A trooper. He is based on Constable Michael Scanlan.
Bracken: A trooper. He is based on Constable Hugh Bracken.

Macready Ham: A tragic actor.
Leon: An actor and contemporary of Macready Ham.
Mr. Curnow: A schoolmaster and newspaper correspondent. He is based on Thomas Curnow.
Mick Mulcahy: A farmhand.
McIntyre: A trooper. He is based on Constable Thomas McIntyre.
Melpomone Prim: A member of the "Rush for Gold" theatre troupe.
Father Gibney: A priest. He is based on Father Matthew Gibney.
Mr. Jones: The landlord of Jones's Hotel in Glenrowan. In reality, the Glenrowan Inn was owned by publican Ann Jones, whom Mr. Jones likely plays the role of.
Mrs. Kelly: The mother of Ned, Dan, and Kate Kelly. She is based on Ellen Kelly.
Lucretia Aspen: A "giddy" 60-year-old.
Mary Byrne: The sister of Joe Byrne.
Kate Kelly: The sister of Ned and Dan Kelly, called "the Pride of the Forest".
Martin Cherry: A crippled individual. He is based on an individual of the same name.
Mr. Brown: The manager of the bank in Jerilderie.

References

Australian plays
1899 plays
Plays set in Australia
Plays based on real people
Plays set in the 19th century
Cultural depictions of Ned Kelly
Biographical plays about criminals